Motihari Assembly constituency is an assembly constituency in Purvi Champaran district in the Indian state of Bihar.  In 2015 Bihar Legislative Assembly election, Motihari will be one of the 36 seats to have VVPAT enabled electronic voting machines.

Overview
As per orders of Delimitation of Parliamentary and Assembly constituencies Order, 2008, 19. Motihari Assembly constituency is composed of the following: Motihari community development block including Motihari nagar parishad and Lautnaha notified area and Piprakothi CD block.

Motihari Assembly constituency is part of 3. Purvi Champaran (Lok Sabha constituency). It was earlier part of Motihari (Lok Sabha constituency).

Members of Legislative Assembly

Election results

2020

References

External links
 

Assembly constituencies of Bihar
Politics of East Champaran district